Thomas Carl Stouch (December 2, 1869 – October 7, 1956) was a Major League Baseball second baseman who played four games with the Louisville Colonels of the National League in 1898. He is best known for "discovering" Shoeless Joe Jackson who played against him while Jackson was in a mill team in Greer, South Carolina in 1907.

Playing career
Stouch was born in Perrysville, Ohio in 1869. His professional career started in the Texas League in 1892. He also played for a minor league team in Charleston in 1892. He moved on to Lancaster of the Pennsylvania State League in 1895. He moved around the Minors playing with four teams in 1896. He played in the New England League in 1897 and 1898 before landing a four-game stint with the Louisville Colonels in 1898. He had a .313 batting average, with 6 runs batted in in 16 at bats during his stint in the major leagues. He went back to the minor leagues playing in the Virginia League, the Atlanta Crackers of the Southern Association, and the Tennessee-Alabama League before becoming player-manager of the Greenville Spinners.

Shoeless Joe Jackson
Stouch first discovered Jackson while playing an exhibition game against Jackson mill team in Greer, South Carolina in 1907. His team couldn't hold Jackson off the bases and Stouch made sure Jackson moved up the Minor Leagues. He got the chance to sign Jackson when he was offered the job of managing the Spinners in 1908. He quickly signed Jackson for $75 a month, more than Jackson made playing in the mill leagues. When the Philadelphia Athletics of the American League offered $900 for his contract, Stouch was the one who convinced Jackson who originally hesitated to play for the Athletics.

Later career
Stouch was player-manager for the Greenville Spinners for four seasons from 1907 to 1912, with the exception of an eight-game stint with Augusta of the Sally League in 1911. He retired to Lancaster, where he died at the age of 86.

References

External links

1869 births
1956 deaths
19th-century baseball players
Major League Baseball second basemen
Louisville Colonels players
San Antonio Missionaries players
New Orleans Pelicans (baseball) players
Charleston Sea Gulls players
York White Roses players
Lancaster Chicks players
Lancaster Maroons players
Pawtucket Phenoms players
Pawtucket Tigers players
Providence Clamdiggers (baseball) players
Providence Grays (minor league) players
Taunton Herrings players
Scranton Miners players
Richmond Blue Birds players
Selma Christians players
Atlanta Firemen players
Decatur (minor league baseball) players
Greenville Mountaineers players
Greenville Spinners players
Augusta Tourists players
Furman Paladins baseball coaches
Minor league baseball managers
People from Perrysville, Ohio
Baseball players from Ohio
Paterson Silk Weavers players